Urban Knights I is the debut album of the jazz group Urban Knights released in 1995 by GRP Records. The album reached No. 5 on the Billboard Jazz Albums chart.

Overview
Urban Knights 1 was produced by Maurice White. Artists such as The Emotions, Freddie Hubbard, Grover Washington Jr. and Omar Hakim appeared on the album. Urban Knights I also features a cover of Earth, Wind & Fire's 1981 single "Wanna Be with You".

Track listing

Personnel

Victor Bailey	-        Electric bass
Paulinho Da Costa -	Percussion 
The Emotions -	Vocals 
Omar Hakim	 -       Drums, vocals 
Jeanette Hawes -       Vocals 
Freddie Hubbard -	Trumpet 
Sheila Hutchinson -	Vocals 
Paul Jackson Jr. -	Guitar 
Ramsey Lewis -     Piano 
Michael Logan	 -      Synthesizer, vocals 
Bill Meyers	-       Synthesizer
Jimi Randolph  -       Producer 
Wanda Vaughn -	Vocals 
Grover Washington Jr. - Soprano and tenor saxophone

Charts

References

1995 albums
Albums produced by Maurice White
GRP Records albums
Urban Knights albums